The Parliamentary Peace Aims Group was a group of British Labour MPs during the Second World War that wanted a negotiated peace.  It was organised by Richard Stokes.

Its Memorandum of Peace Aims was published in November 1939 in the Daily Herald and was supported by over 70 Constituency Labour Partys.  Richard Stokes narrowly failed to get elected as a constituency representative to the Labour National Executive Committee in 1941.

Membership

Members of the group were:

 James Barr
 George Buchanan
 William Cove
 Rhys Davies
 Agnes Hardie
 David Kirkwood
 George Lansbury
 William Leonard
 H. G. McGhee
 Neil MacLean
 Malcolm Macmillan
 George Mathers
 Fred Messer
 Alfred Salter
 Reg Sorensen
 Richard Stokes
 Cecil Wilson

References